Dawn! is a 1979 Australian sports biopic about the three-time Olympic gold medallist swimmer Dawn Fraser, who served as technical adviser for the production, it starring Bronwyn Mackay Payne and Bunney Brooke, written by Joy Cavill and directed by Ken Hannam. The film was entered into the 11th Moscow International Film Festival.

Plot
The film deals with Dawn Fraser's rise to fame as a champion Olympic swimmer, her anti-authoritarian clashes with Australian Swimming officials, her triumphs, marriage and eventual divorce.

Cast
Bronwyn Mackay-Payne as Dawn Fraser
Ron Haddrick ... Pop
Bunney Brooke ... Mum
Tom Richards ... Harry
John Diedrich ... Gary
Gabrielle Hartley ... Kate
Ivar Kants ... Len
David Cameron ... Joe
Kevin Wilson ... Bippy

Production
The film was produced by Joy Cavill who had previously made a documentary, The Dawn Fraser Story (1964).

In the 1970s Cavill wrote a script based on Fraser's life and showed it to Jill Robb and John Morris of the South Australian Film Corporation. They agrees to put up $250,000 and raise the balance of the money in exchange for 50% of the profits.

The lead, Bronwyn Mackay-Payne, was cast after a search that involved interviewing 1,200 girls and screen testing ten. Mackay-Payne had never acted before.

Shooting began on 19 September 1977 and went for ten weeks, with studio work in Adelaide and location shooting in Balmain, Sydney, Melbourne Olympic Stadium, and Tokyo.

Reception
The film performed disappointingly at the box office.

See also
 Cinema of Australia
 List of Australian films
 Australian films of 1979
 List of films set in Australia
 List of films shot in Adelaide

References

External links
Dawn! – IMDb
Dawn! at Oz Movies
Dawn's Own Website

1979 films
1970s sports drama films
Films set in Australia
Australian sports drama films
Films shot in Adelaide
Sports films based on actual events
Films about the Summer Olympics
Films about Olympic swimming and diving
1979 drama films
Cultural depictions of Australian women
Cultural depictions of swimmers
Films directed by Ken Hannam
1970s English-language films
1970s Australian films